Hutchinson Technology is a company that specializes in the design and manufacture of precision technologies.  Hutchinson's primary products are suspension assemblies that hold magnetic read-write heads at microscopic distances above the disks in rigid disk drives.

Hutchinson Technology was founded in 1965 by Jon Geiss and Jeffrey Greene, initially to produce gyroscope components for missiles.  It next supplied printed circuit boards to Minnesota's two largest computer companies, Univac and Control Data.  With contracts from Control Data and IBM in the 1970s, it developed the specialized mechanisms that precisely positioned the read-write heads for magnetic disk drives.  It grew to employ 3,000 people (2001-2010).

On November 2, 2015 Japanese electronics company TDK announced plans to purchase Hutchinson Technology for $126 million.

Hutchinson's manufacturing plants and logistics warehouses are located in Hutchinson, Minnesota; and Eau Claire, Wisconsin.  Logistics warehouses are located in Brooklyn Park, Minnesota.

Disk Drive Division Asian sales offices are located in Dongguan, China; Wuxi, China; Tokyo, Japan; Seoul, Korea; Singapore; and Bangkok, Thailand.

BioMeasurement Division European sales offices are located in Arnhem, The Netherlands.

References

External links
Official website

Manufacturing companies based in Minnesota